The 2014 Watford Borough Council election took place on 22 May 2014 to elect members of Watford Borough Council in England. This was on the same day as other local elections.

References

2014 English local elections
2014
2010s in Hertfordshire